Hampala salweenensis is a southeast Asian species of cyprinid, endemic to the basin of the Salween in Thailand and Myanmar. It reaches a length of 30 cm.

References

Cyprinid fish of Asia
Fish of Myanmar
Fish of Thailand
Fish described in 1994